Robert William Flavell (7 March 1956 – 11 December 1995) was an English professional footballer. He was born in Berwick-upon-Tweed, Northumberland. Flavell made nearly 250 league appearances during spells with a number of British clubs.

References

1956 births
1995 deaths
People from Berwick-upon-Tweed
English footballers
Association football fullbacks
Association football midfielders
Burnley F.C. players
Halifax Town A.F.C. players
Chesterfield F.C. players
Barnsley F.C. players
Västerås SK Fotboll players
Hibernian F.C. players
Motherwell F.C. players
Dundee United F.C. players
Berwick Rangers F.C. players
Newtongrange Star F.C. players
English Football League players
Scottish Football League players
English expatriate footballers
Expatriate footballers in Sweden
Footballers from Northumberland